Great Work is a term used in Hermeticism and occult traditions descended from it, such as Thelema. Accomplishing the Great Work, symbolized as the creation of the philosopher's stone, represents the culmination of the spiritual path, the attainment of enlightenment, or the rescue of the human soul from the unconscious forces which bind it. The Great Work signifies the spiritual path towards self-transcendence in its entirety. This is the process of bringing unconscious complexes into the conscious awareness, in order to integrate them back into oneself.

Ceremonial magic

Eliphas Levi 
Eliphas Levi (1810–1875), one of the first modern ceremonial magicians and inspiration for the Hermetic Order of the Golden Dawn, discussed the Great Work at length, giving it a spiritual meaning by analogy to the alchemical  of 'perfecting' lead into gold and mortality into immortality:

He further defined it as such:

Thelema 

Within Thelema, the Great Work is generally defined as those spiritual practices leading to the mystical union of the Self and the All through the accomplishment of True Will. Its founder, author and occultist Aleister Crowley, re-iterated the idea of the unification of opposites, saying in his book Magick Without Tears:

Although the Great Work can describe specifically the moment of union between the self and the divine, it can also deal with the spiritual process in its entirety. Crowley also speaks on the Great Work as the conscious process of spiritual growth. The aspect of conscious devotion to the Great Work is very important. By purposefully, consciously turning inward and choosing to pursue self-realization, the seeker seals themselves in their very own vas hermeticum, their very own alchemical vessel. This attitude of deliberate turning within is necessary for the Great Work. By consciously devoting oneself to the Great Work, and therefore sealing oneself within one's own vas hermeticum, the inner heat of psychic struggle which is generated from this aids in the dissolution of ego boundaries and the integration of what is unconscious.

References 

Hermeticism
Hermetic Qabalah